Portrait of the Painter Moisè Kisling is 1915 oil painting by Italian painter Amedeo Modigliani, a portrait of Modigliani's friend Moïse Kisling. The painting is the collection of  Pinacoteca di Brera in Milan, Italy

References

1915 paintings
Paintings by Amedeo Modigliani
Paintings of people
Paintings in the collection of the Pinacoteca di Brera